Fentin acetate is an organotin compound with the formula (C6H5)3SnO2CCH3. It is a colourless solid that was previously used as a fungicide.

Structure
Most carboxylates of triphenyltin adopt polymeric structures with five-coordinate Sn centers.

References

External links

Acetate esters
Obsolete pesticides
Fungicides
Triphenyltin compounds